"1974 (We Were Young)" is a 1988 single by Christian music singer Amy Grant. It was released as the third single from her album Lead Me On.

The song
The song is about Grant's discovery of faith at the age of fourteen (Grant was born on November 25, 1960), the first verse saying, "We were young...Down upon our knees/we tasted holy wine." In the chorus, Grant tells of God's love at the founding of Him, saying, "Purer than the sky behind the rain...Love had lit a fire we were the flame."  The final verses talk about how the discovery of God changes people: "No one had to say we were changed/Nothing else we lived through would ever be the same" and how those who experience God's love never want it to go away: "Stay with me/Make it ever new."  In interviews following the release of the song, she revealed that it should have been titled "1975".

Chart success
Unlike Grant's previous few singles, "1974" did not achieve mainstream success. Although a #1 Christian single, "1974" only managed to reach #34 on the Adult Contemporary chart, to date Grant's worst performance on that chart.
The B side of the single is "If You Have to Go Away", another track from the album.

Personnel
 Amy Grant – lead and backing vocals
 Robbie Buchanan – keyboards 
 Alan Pasqua – keyboards
 Dann Huff – 12-string guitar
 Jerry McPherson – electric guitar, zither
 Mike Brignardello – bass
 Paul Leim – drums
 Lenny Castro – percussion

Charts

References

Amy Grant songs
1988 singles
Songs written by Amy Grant
Songs written by Gary Chapman (musician)
1988 songs
A&M Records singles